Maria Jufereva-Skuratovski (born 11 October 1979, in Tallinn) is an Estonian politician. She has been a member of XIV Riigikogu.

In 2001, she graduated from Tallinn University with a degree in journalism. In 2006 she graduated from University of Tartu with a master's degree in journalism. 2005-2010 she was a teacher of media criticism. 2015-2019 she was Tallinn Lasnamäe District Elder.

Since 2013, she is a member of Estonian Centre Party.

References

1979 births
21st-century Estonian women politicians
Estonian Centre Party politicians
Estonian people of Russian descent
Living people
Members of the Riigikogu, 2019–2023
Members of the Riigikogu, 2023–2027
Politicians from Tallinn
Tallinn University alumni
University of Tartu alumni
Women members of the Riigikogu